Subir Kumar Ghosh (1932–2008) was an Indian structural geologist and an emeritus professor at Jadavpur University. He was known for his studies on theoretical and experimental structural geology and was an elected fellow of the Indian National Science Academy, and the Indian Academy of Sciences. The Council of Scientific and Industrial Research, the apex agency of the Government of India for scientific research, awarded him the Shanti Swarup Bhatnagar Prize for Science and Technology, one of the highest Indian science awards for his contributions to Earth, Atmosphere, Ocean and Planetary Sciences in 1977.

Biography 

Born on 1 March 1932 in the Indian state of West Bengal, S. K. Ghosh graduated in science (BSc) from University of Kolkata and after completing a master's degree from the same institution, he joined his alma mater as a member of the faculty of geology in 1958. Simultaneously, enrolled at Presidency College, Kolkata for his doctoral studies under the guidance of Santosh Kumar Ray and secured a PhD working on the time-correlation of the structural and metamorphic histories of the terrain in Kuilapal village in Purulia District. Subsequently, he moved to Uppsala University where he worked under Hans Ramberg, a renowned geologist who would later lend his name to Rambergite mineral. He stayed with Ramberg for two years at the end of which period he received the degree of Filosofisk doktorgrad from Uppsala University in 1967 and returned to join Jadavpur University where he set up an experimental laboratory to continue his researches. He served the university till his superannuation in 1997 but continued his association post-retirement as an emeritus professor, an INSA senior scientist and as an INSA honorary scientist. During this period, he also had a short stint in Sweden as a research associate for the Swedish National Programme for the Geodynamics Project.

Dr. Ghosh was married to Sheila Ghosh née Sen and the couple's son Abhik Ghosh is a noted chemist. He died on 30 October 2008, at the age of 76.

Legacy 

Focusing his attention on the theoretical and experimental aspects of structural geology, Ghosh studied the geometrical relationships of the axial surfaces of folds with the principal planes of deformation and his researches assisted in the wider understanding of the geological phenomena such as superposed buckle folding, buckling due to constructional deformation, rotation of spherical and ellipsoidal inclusions in shear zones, deformation of early lineations, chocolate tablet boudinage and evolution of shear zone structures. A theory on conglomerate deformation and an analysis of the mechanism of distortion of planar structure around rigid bodies have been credited to him. His researches have been documented as a book, Structural Geology: Fundamentals and Modern Developments, as chapters in books edited by others and as over 50 peer-reviewed articles, the article repository of the Indian Academy of Sciences has listed a number of them. He also published a field guide for field research in Ghatsila. He served as a National professor of the University Grants Commission of India during 1979–80 and sat in the editorial boards of the Journal of Structural Geology of Oxford University Press and Tectonophysics of Elsevier, besides mentoring thirteen doctoral scholars in their studies.

Awards and honors 
The Council of Scientific and Industrial Research awarded Ghosh the Shanti Swarup Bhatnagar Prize, one of the highest Indian science awards, in 1977. The Indian National Science Academy elected him as their fellow in 1979, INSA would honor him again in 1998 with K. Naha Memorial Medal. The same year, the Indian Academy of Sciences also elected him as a fellow. Evolution of Geological Structures in Micro- to Macro-scales, edited by Sudipta Sengupta and published by Springer in 1997 is a festschrift on Ghosh and Kshitindramohan Naha, another noted geologist.

Selected bibliography

Books

Chapters

Articles

See also 

 Kshitindramohan Naha
 Abhik Ghosh
 Hans Ramberg
 Sudipta Sengupta

Notes

References

External links 
 

Recipients of the Shanti Swarup Bhatnagar Award in Earth, Atmosphere, Ocean & Planetary Sciences
1932 births
Indian scientific authors
Fellows of the Indian Academy of Sciences
Fellows of the Indian National Science Academy
2008 deaths
Scientists from Kolkata
Bengali scientists
Presidency University, Kolkata alumni
University of Calcutta alumni
20th-century Indian geologists
Academic staff of Jadavpur University
Academic staff of the University of Calcutta
Structural geologists
20th-century Indian educational theorists